K.P. Janaki Ammal (1917-1992) was a politician from Communist Party of India (Marxist) and president of All India Democratic Women's Association. She represented Madurai East in the Tamil Nadu legislative assembly in 1967.

Early life 
Born in 1917, she was the only child of Padmanabhan and Lakshmi. Her early life was spent in poverty. Her mother died when she was 8 years old, and she was raised by her grandmother. She dropped out of school in the eighth grade, in order to pursue music. She Palaniappa Pillai Boys Company for a salary of Rs.25 per month. She later went on to become the lead actress and earned over Rs. 300 per performance.  She teamed up with S.S. Viswanathadas on stage, to engage with the issue of caste based untouchability.

Janaki Ammal married a harmonium player from the troupe, Gurusamy Naidu.

Career 
She is known as the first South Indian woman to be arrested by the British. She was first arrested in 1930 while performing in Tirunelveli and spent one year in jail. She was arrested for participating in anti- war propaganda in Trichy, under the Defence of India Rules.

She was one of the active political members of the Individual Satyagraha Movement. In 1936, she joined Congress party and worked as the office bearer in the Madurai Congress Committee She then shifted to the Congress Socialist Party. She joined Communist Party of India in 1940. After the party's split, she moved to the Communist Party of India (Marxist).

Janaki Ammal and Ponmalai Paapa Umanath were founders of the Tamil Nadu Democratic Women's Association in 1974, where the former became its first president.

Personal life 
During the Emergency, she sold off her jewellery and silk clothes to raise money for food, for party cadres.

Repeated arrests and never ending hard work took a toll on her health. She died of asthma on 1 March 1992.

References 

Indian women's rights activists
Communist Party of India (Marxist) politicians from Tamil Nadu
1917 births
1992 deaths
Women in Tamil Nadu politics
20th-century Indian women politicians
20th-century Indian politicians
People from Madurai district
Women Indian independence activists
Indian independence activists from Tamil Nadu